Hugh Lachlan McPherson (21 August 1918 – 25 July 2013) was an Australian rules footballer who played with Footscray and Melbourne in the Victorian Football League (VFL).

Notes

External links 	
	

1918 births
2013 deaths
Australian rules footballers from Victoria (Australia)
Western Bulldogs players
Melbourne Football Club players
Kyneton Football Club players